Davide di Lernia (born 11 November 1978, in Milan, Italy) is a film director, producer and editor. During his career, he worked for three important Italian radios: Radio Monte Carlo, Radio 105 Network and Virgin Radio.

References

1978 births
Living people
People of Apulian descent